The 2017 AFL Tasmania TSL premiership season is an Australian rules football competition staged across Tasmania, Australia over twenty-one home and away rounds and six finals series matches between 31 March and 23 September.

The League was known as the Southern Cross State League under a commercial naming-rights sponsorship agreement with the company.

North Launceston defeated Lauderdale by 87 points to win the 2017 TSL Grand Final.

Participating clubs
Burnie Dockers Football Club
Clarence District Football Club
Devonport Football Club
Glenorchy District Football Club
Tigers Football Club
North Hobart Football Club
Lauderdale Football Club
Launceston Football Club
North Launceston Football Club

2017 TSL coaches
Clint Proctor (Burnie)
Jeromey Webberley (Clarence)
Mitch Thorp (Devonport)
Aaron Cornelius (Glenorchy)
Kane Richter (Hobart City)
Darren Winter (Lauderdale)
Sam Lonergan (Launceston)
Tom Couch (North Launceston)
Scott Matheson & Aaron Vince (Tigers FC)

Awards
 Alastair Lynch Medal (Best afield throughout season): Bradley Cox-Goodyer (North Launceston)
 Lefroy Medal (Best afield in State Game): Jay Lockhart (North Launceston)
 RACT Insurance Player of the Year (Best player voted by the media): Jaye Bowden (Glenorchy)
 Matthew Richardson Medal (Rookie of the Year): James Holmes (Clarence)
 Baldock Medal (Grand Final Best on Ground): Bradley Cox-Goodyer (North Launceston)
 Cazaly Medal (Premiership Coach in TSL): Tom Couch (North Launceston) 
Development League Grand Final Best On Ground: Luke Murfitt-Cowen (Clarence)
 Hudson Medal (Highest goal kicker in TSL season): Jaye Bowden (Glenorchy) 52 Goals

2017 TSL leading goalkickers
Jaye Bowden (Glenorchy) - 53
Sonny Whiting (Launceston) - 50
Bradley Cox-Goodyer (North Launceston - 45
Tom Couch (North Launceston) - 45
Thor Boscott (Lauderdale) - 44

Highest Individual Goalkickers In a Match
 11 – Jaye Bowden (Glenorchy) v (Devonport) – 8 April 2017 at KGV Oval
 9 – Thor Boscott (Lauderdale) v (Tigers FC) – 15 July 2017 at Lauderdale Oval
 8 – Bradley Cox-Goodyer (North Launceston) v (Lauderdale) – 23 September 2017 at UTAS Stadium
 7 – Sonny Whiting (Launceston) v (Burnie) – 8 April 2017 at Windsor Park
 7 – Trent Standen (Clarence) v (Glenorchy) – 6 May 2017 at KGV Oval
 7 – Tom Couch (North Launceston) v (Hobart City) – 17 June 2017 at North Hobart Oval
 7 – Rulla Kelly-Mansell (Launceston) v (Burnie) – 17 June 2017 at West Park Oval
 7 – Ryan Wiggins (Lauderdale) v (Clarence) – 2 September 2017 at Blundstone Arena

Premiership season
Source: TSL Season 2017 results and fixtures

Round 1

Round 2

Round 3

Round 4

Round 5

Round 6

Round 7

Round 8

Round 9

Round 10

Round 11

Round 12

Round 13

Round 14

Round 15

Round 16

Round 17

Round 18

Round 19

Round 20

Round 21

Ladder

Season records

Highest club scores
 28.18. (186) – Glenorchy v Devonport 8 April 2017 at KGV Oval
 25.18. (168) - Lauderdale v Burnie 27 May 2017 at Lauderdale Oval
 24.22. (166) – Glenorchy v Burnie 8 July 2017 at KGV Oval

Lowest club scores
 2.5. (17) – Devonport v Launceston 6.8. (44) – 12 August 2017 at Devonport Oval
 2.6. (18) – Burnie v Glenorchy 29.14. (188) – 30 April 2017 at West Park Oval 
 2.6. (18) – Burnie v North Launceston 23.22. (160) – 19 August 2017 at UTAS Stadium

TSL Team Of The Year

TSL Finals Series

Elimination Final
(Saturday 2 September)
Launceston: 1.4. (10) | 4.6. (30) | 10.10. (70) | 14.15. (99)
 Glenorchy: 2.2. (14) | 5.7. (37) | 6.8. (44) | 10.10. (70)
at Blundstone Arena

Qualifying Final
(Saturday 2 September)
 Lauderdale: 6.2. (38) | 8.2. (50) | 12.6. (78) | 20.6. (126)
Clarence: 3.2. (20) | 7.10. (52) | 9.15. (69) | 10.19. (79)
at Blundstone Arena

1st Semi-Final
Launceston: 1.0. (6) | 6.2. (38) | 9.4. (58) | 13.8. (86)
Clarence: 3.2. (20) | 4.4. (28) | 5.7. (37) | 7.11. (53)
at Blundstone Arena

2nd Semi-Final
 North Launceston: 5.5. (35) | 9.9. (63) | 14.13. (97) | 18.21. (129)
 Lauderdale: 0.3. (3) | 2.10. (22) | 4.11. (35) | 4.11. (35)
at UTAS Stadium

Preliminary Final
 Lauderdale: 2.3. (15) | 7.7. (49) | 10.8. (68) | 12.14. (86)
 Launceston: 5.3. (33) | 6.5. (41) | 9.7. (61) | 9.8. (62)
at Blundstone Arena

Grand Final

Mercury Cup Grand Final (Development League)
(Saturday 23 September)
Clarence: 3.1. (19) | 4.1. (25) | 7.5. (47) | 11.7. (73)
 Launceston: 3.2. (20) | 6.3. (39) | 8.4. (52) | 8.7. (55)
at UTAS Stadium

State Game

References

External links
 Tasmanian State League Website
 AFL Tasmania

2017
2017 in Australian rules football